West Bromwich Albion Football Club was founded as West Bromwich Strollers in 1878 by workers from George Salter's Spring Works and turned professional in 1885. Albion won the FA Cup for the first time in 1888 and later that year became one of the founder members of the Football League. In the 1900–01 season, the club moved to its current home ground, The Hawthorns. Albion have spent the majority of their history – 81 of 123 seasons – in the top division of English football, including 24 seasons in a row between 1949–50 and 1972–73. From 1986–87 to 2001–02, they spent sixteen consecutive seasons outside the top division, recording their lowest ever league finish of seventh in Division Three in 1991–92. Albion have been promoted eleven times and relegated twelve times, with seven of the 23 changes of division coming between 2002 and 2010. The team played in the Premier League for the first time in 2002–03.

Albion have won the League Championship once, the FA Cup five times, the League Cup once and the Charity Shield twice, one of which was shared. They have been runners-up in the League Championship twice, in the FA Cup five times and in the League Cup twice. In European competitions, Albion have reached the quarter-final stage of both the Cup Winners' Cup and UEFA Cup.

The club has played more than one hundred seasons since their first entry in the FA Cup in 1883–84. The table details the club's achievements in all national and European first team competitions, and records their top league goalscorer, for each completed season. Records of locally organised cup competitions such as the Birmingham Senior Cup and Staffordshire Senior Cup, which have permitted reserve teams from the 1900s onwards, are not included.

Seasons

Key

Key to league record:
 Pld = Matches played
 W = Matches won
 D = Matches drawn
 L = Matches lost
 GF = Goals for
 GA = Goals against
 Pts = Points
 Pos = Final position

Key to divisions:
 FL = Football League
 Div 1 = Football League First Division
 Div 2 = Football League Second Division
 Div 3 = Football League Third Division
 Prem = Premier League
 Chmp = EFL Championship
 N/A = Not applicable

Key to rounds:
 DNE = Did not enter
 QR = Qualifying round
 Grp = Group stage
 R1 = Round 1
 R2 = Round 2
 R3 = Round 3
 R4 = Round 4
 R5 = Round 5

 QF = Quarter-finals
 SF = Semi-finals
 ASF = Area semi-finals
 AF = Area final
 RU = Runners-up
 WS = Shared
 W = Winners

Divisions in bold indicate a change in division.
Players in bold indicate the top scorer in the division that season.

 Seasons spent at Level 1 of football league system: 81
 Seasons spent at Level 2 of football league system: 40
 Seasons spent at Level 3 of football league system: 2
 Seasons spent at Level 4 of football league system: 0

Footnotes

References
General
 
 
 
 
 West Bromwich Albion at Soccerbase.com (Results/Fixtures, League Table)

Specific

External links
 

Seasons
 
West Bromwich Albion